The surname Beilin derives from the Ashkenazi Jewish ethnic group. It is related to the large amount of Ashkenazi Jewish surnames derived from the name "Bella".

People with the surname
 Asher Beilin (born 1881), Ukrainian Hebrew and Yiddish journalist
 Irving Berlin (born 1888, Israel Isidore Beilin), American composer and lyricist
 Isaac Beilin (d. 1897), Imperial Russian teacher and physician
 Michael Beilin (born 1976), Israeli Olympic Greco-Roman wrestler
 Yossi Beilin (born 1948), left-wing Israeli politician

Jewish surnames